Kalinka may refer to:

Places
Kalinka, Kardzhali Province, Kardzhali Municipality, Bulgaria
Kalinka Temple, a temple in northern India
Kalinka, Lublin Voivodeship, a village in the Lublin Voivodeship, Poland
Kalinka, Russia, the name of several rural localities in Russia

People
Kalinka (artist) (born 1968), Italo-Russian video-artist
Kalinka Bamberski, a French girl who was murdered by her German stepfather in 1982
Ernst Kalinka (1865–1946), Austrian archaeologist
Valerian Kalinka (1826–1886), Polish priest and historian

Other
"Kalinka" (1860 song), a Russian folk song
"Kalinka" (Infernal song), 1998
"Kalinka", a song by Morandi, 2018
Kalinka (film), a 2016 French film
Kalinka Cossack, a character in the video game Mega Man 4

See also
 Kalina (disambiguation)